Richard E. Eustis was an American football player and coach.  He played college football for Wesleyan University from 1911 to 1913 and served as the university's head football coach from 1914 to 1915.  He also served as the head football coach at New York University (NYU) in 1916.

Playing career
Eustis was the son of New York Public Service Commissioner John E. Eustis of New York City.  Eustis enrolled at Wesleyan University, where he played football as a fullback and end from 1911 to 1913.  He was the captain of Wesleyan's 1913 football team.  The New York Times described Eustis as "the mainstay on [Wesleyan's] football team for three years, playing full back and end with equal ability."

Coach career
In February 1914, while he was still a student, Eustis was hired as the new head football coach at Wesleyan.  He served as Wesleyan's head football coach from 1914 to 1915 and compiled a record of 10–7–1. He graduated from Wesleyan in 1915. In 1916, Eustis was hired as the head football coach at New York University.  In his only season as NYU's head coach, he compiled a record of 4–3–1. His brother Elmer T. Eustis was the assistant football coach on the 1914 NYU Violets team.

Head coaching record

References

Year of birth missing
Year of death missing
American football ends
American football fullbacks
NYU Violets football coaches
Wesleyan Cardinals football players
Wesleyan Cardinals football coaches